Davay-e Lat (also Romanized as Daʿvāy-e Lāt) is a village in Amlash-e Jonubi Rural District, in the Central District of Amlash County, Gilan Province, Iran. At the 2006 census, its population was 330, in 81 families.

References 

Populated places in Amlash County